Pavle Ninkov (Serbian Cyrillic: Павле Нинков, born 20 April 1985) is a Serbian football right-back. His former clubs include Radnički Beograd, Rad and Čukarički, and Ligue 1 side Toulouse FC. In international competition Ninkov has represented Serbia.

Club career

Red Star Belgrade
In January 2008, he joined Red Star Belgrade from FK Čukarički. Ninkov was given the number 24 shirt for Red Star Belgrade and became an integral member of the squad. During the 2010–11 season he was promoted to team captain.

Toulouse
On 21 June 2011, he joined Toulouse FC, signing a four-year contract with the club.

Ninkov began the 2013–14 season playing 13 league matches, starting eight times. In December 2013, Toulouse announced he would be out of action for three weeks due to a foot injury.

He was released by the club at the end of the 2016–17 season.

Zemun
In February 2018, Ninkov signed for FK Zemun.

International career
Ninkov made his debut for the Serbia national football team on 6 February 2008 during a friendly match against Macedonia. Ninkov was then called up by coach Miroslav Đukić to represent Serbia's Olympic football team at the 2008 Summer Olympics in Beijing, but did not participate.

On 11 November 2011, in a friendly match against Mexico, Mexican TV referred to Ninkov as "Pablo Ninkon".

Career statistics

References

External links
 

1985 births
Living people
Footballers from Belgrade
Association football defenders
Serbian footballers
Serbia international footballers
Serbian expatriate footballers
FK Radnički Beograd players
FK Rad players
FK Čukarički players
Red Star Belgrade footballers
Toulouse FC players
FK Zemun players
Serbian SuperLiga players
Ligue 1 players
Expatriate footballers in France
Serbian expatriate sportspeople in France